The fourth senatorial elections of the Fifth Republic were held in France on September 22, 1968.

Context 
This election has depended largely of the results of 1965 municipal elections.

Results

Senate Presidency 
On October 3, 1968, Alain Poher was elected president of the Senate.

List of senators elected

References 

1968
1968 elections in France